Menlo Emmetts GAA is a Gaelic Athletic Association club located in the village of Menlo, County Galway, Ireland. The club is primarily concerned with the game of hurling.

History

Menlo Emmetts was established in 1981 when a number of Castlegar club members decided to set up their own club. The club has operated at junior level for all of its existence, with Galway JBHC title being won in 1983 and 2006. Arguably, the Menlo Emmetts club enjoyed its greatest success in 2007bwhen the club defeated Tara Rocks to claim the All-Ireland JBHC title.

Honours

All-Ireland Junior B Club Hurling Championship (1): 2007
Galway Junior B Hurling Championship]] (2): 1983, 2006

References

Gaelic games clubs in County Galway
Hurling clubs in County Galway